"Gangster Tripping" (released as a single under the name "Gangster Trippin", which is also the title of the clean version that censors profanity) is a song by British big beat musician Fatboy Slim. It was released on 5 October 1998 as the second single from his second studio album, You've Come a Long Way, Baby (1998).

Samples
The song contains samples from "Entropy" by DJ Shadow, "Word Play" and "The Turntablist Anthem" by the X-Ecutioners, "Beatbox Wash" by the Dust Junkys (this track contains the song's chorus line), "Change the Mood" by Jackie Mittoo, "Sissy Walk" by Freedom Now Brothers, and "You Did It" by Ann Robinson. The song was featured in the 2006 PlayStation Portable game Lumines II and the 1999 film Go. The single peaked at  3 in the United Kingdom and No. 49 in Switzerland.

The recognizable "We gotta kick that gangsta shit" sample comes from the first recorded live performance by jazz rap duo Pete Rock & CL Smooth (sampled by DJ Shadow on "Entropy"). In the radio cut, it was re-edited for censorship purposes.

In 2013, Nicky Lockett (aka MC Tunes) of the Dust Junkys won a three-year court case to recover unpaid royalties for use of his vocals in the main chorus of the song.

Music video
The music video for "Gangster Trippin", directed by Roman Coppola, consists simply of scenes of furniture sets exploding, shown from multiple angles, and often in slow-motion. Fatboy Slim himself makes a cameo in the video, being shown on a photograph on the mirror where a lady stands up from. According to MTV at the time, the script for the video contained just one line: "Blow stuff up".

The video shows certain similarities to the ending of Antonioni's Zabriskie Point where several pieces of furniture are blown up similarly in slow motion and from different angles. Director Coppola often praised the works of Antonioni in interviews.

Track listings
Standard CD, 12-inch, and cassette single
 "Gangster Trippin"
 "The World Went Down"
 "Jack It Up (DJ Delite)"

European CD single
 "Gangster Trippin"
 "The World Went Down"

Japanese CD single
 "Gangster Trippin" (radio edit)
 "Gangster Trippin" (full version)
 "Jack It Up (DJ Delite)"

Charts

Weekly charts

Year-end charts

Certifications

Release history

References

1998 songs
1998 singles
Astralwerks singles
Fatboy Slim songs
Music videos directed by Roman Coppola
Songs written by Norman Cook
Skint Records singles
UK Independent Singles Chart number-one singles